Filippo Petterini (born 14 November 1980 in Foligno) is an Italian footballer who currently plays as a defender for Barletta in the Lega Pro Prima Divisione.

References

External links
 

1980 births
Living people
People from Foligno
Italian footballers
A.C. Perugia Calcio players
A.S.D. Città di Foligno 1928 players
A.S. Sambenedettese players
S.S.D. Lucchese 1905 players
Delfino Pescara 1936 players
A.S.D. Barletta 1922 players
Footballers from Umbria
Association football defenders
Sportspeople from the Province of Perugia